Impétueux was a  74-gun ship of the line of the French Navy.

She took part in the Glorious First of June in 1794. During the battle,  became tangled with Impétueux. Badly damaged and on the verge of surrender, Impétueux received a brief reprieve when Mucius appeared through the smoke and collided with both ships. The three entangled ships continued exchanging fire, all suffering heavy casualties with Marlborough and Impétueux losing all three of their masts. This combat continued for several hours. Captain Berkeley of Marlborough had to retire below with serious wounds, and command fell to Lieutenant John Monkton, who signalled for help from the frigates in reserve. Impétueux was in too damaged a state to move at all and sailors from  soon seized her.

The Royal Navy intended to take into service as HMS Impetueux, but she was destroyed in an accidental fire at Portsmouth on 24 August 1794 and so was never commissioned. During the battle of The Glorious First of June, the Royal Navy had also captured her sister ship , which it renamed HMS Impetueux in 1795.

See also
 List of ships of the line of France

References

Ships of the line of the French Navy
Téméraire-class ships of the line
1787 ships
Shipwrecks in the Solent
Maritime incidents in 1794
Ships built in France